The Vredefort impact structure  is the largest verified impact structure on Earth. The remaining structure, comprising the deformed underlying bedrock, is located in present-day Free State province of South Africa. It is named after the town of Vredefort, which is near its centre. The structure's central uplift is known as the Vredefort Dome. The impact structure was formed during the Paleoproterozoic Era, 2.023 billion years (± 4 million years) ago. It is the second-oldest known impact structure on Earth, after Yarrabubba.

In 2005, the Vredefort Dome was added to the list of UNESCO World Heritage Sites for its geologic interest.

Formation and structure

It would have been larger than the  Sudbury Basin and the  Chicxulub crater. The remaining structure, the "Vredefort Dome", consists of a partial ring of hills  in diameter, and is the remains of a dome created by the rebound of rock below the impact site after the collision.

The impact structure's age is estimated to be 2.023 billion years (± 4 million years), which places it in the Orosirian Period of the Paleoproterozoic Era. It is the second oldest universally accepted impact structure on Earth. In comparison, it is about 10% older than the Sudbury Basin impact (at 1.849 billion years) and the Yarrabubba impact crater is older than the Vredefort impact structure by about 0.2 billion years. Other purported older impact structures have either poorly constrained ages (Dhala impact structure, India) or highly contentious impact evidence in case of the circa 3.023 billion year old Maniitsoq structure, West Greenland and the circa 2.4 billion year old Suavjärvi structure, Russia. Their classification as impact structures remain controversial and unsettled.

The dome in the centre of the impact structure was originally thought to have been formed by a volcanic explosion, but in the mid-1990s, evidence revealed it was the site of a huge bolide impact, as telltale shatter cones were discovered in the bed of the nearby Vaal River.

This impact structure is one of the few multiple-ringed impact structures on Earth, although they are more common elsewhere in the Solar System. Perhaps the best-known example is Valhalla crater on Jupiter's moon Callisto. Earth's Moon has some as well. Geological processes, such as erosion and plate tectonics, have destroyed most multiple-ring impact structures on Earth.

The impact distorted the Witwatersrand Basin which was laid down over a period of 250 million years between 950 and 700 million years before the Vredefort impact. The overlying Ventersdorp lavas and the Transvaal Supergroup which were laid down between 700 and 80 million years before the meteorite strike, were similarly distorted by the formation of the  impact structure. The rocks form partial concentric rings around the impact structure's centre today, with the oldest, the Witwatersrand rocks, forming a semicircle  from the centre. Since the Witwatersrand rocks consist of several layers of very hard, erosion-resistant sediments (e.g. quartzites and banded ironstones), they form the prominent arc of hills that can be seen to the northwest of the impact structure's centre in the satellite picture above.

From about halfway through the Pretoria Subgroup of rocks around the impact structure's centre, the order of the rocks is reversed. The Johannesburg group is the most famous one because it was here that gold was discovered in 1886. It is thus possible that if it had not been for the Vredefort impact this gold would never have been discovered.

The  centre of the Vredefort impact structure consists of a granite dome (where it is not covered by much younger rocks belonging to the Karoo Supergroup) which is an exposed part of the Kaapvaal craton, one of the oldest microcontinents which formed on Earth 3.9 billion years ago. This central peak uplift, or dome, is typical of a complex impact structure, where the liquefied rocks splashed up in the wake of the meteor as it penetrated the surface.

Conservation
The Vredefort Dome World Heritage Site is currently subject to property development, and local owners have expressed concern regarding sewage dumping into the Vaal River and the impact structure. The granting of prospecting rights around the edges of the impact structure has led environmental interests to express fear of destructive mining.

Community
The Vredefort Dome in the centre of the impact structure is home to four towns: Parys, Vredefort, Koppies and Venterskroon. Parys is the largest and a tourist hub; both Vredefort and Koppies mainly depend on an agricultural economy.

On 19 December 2011, a broadcasting licence was granted by ICASA to a community radio station to broadcast for the Afrikaans- and English-speaking members of the communities within the impact structure. The Afrikaans name Koepel Stereo (Dome Stereo) refers to the dome and announces its broadcast as KSFM. The station broadcasts on 94.9 MHz FM.

See also
 List of impact craters on Earth
 List of possible impact structures on Earth

References

External links

 Parys South Africa
 Impact Cratering Research Group – University of the Witwatersrand
 Earth Impact Database
 Deep Impact – The Vredefort Dome
 Satellite image of Vredefort impact structure from Google Maps
 Impact Cratering: an overview of Mineralogical and Geochemical aspects – University of Vienna 
 Google Earth 3d .KMZ of 25 largest craters (requires Google Earth)

Extinction events
Impact craters of South Africa
Landforms of the Free State (province)
Proterozoic impact craters
World Heritage Sites in South Africa